Rabsaris ( raḇ-sārīs), possibly means "Chief of officers", (Akkadian: 𒇽𒃲𒊕 rab ša-rēši [LÚ.GAL.SAG]) is the name or title of two individuals mentioned in the Bible.

 Rabasaris (in the Douay–Rheims Bible and the Vulgate;  Raphis) — One of the three officers whom the King of Assyria (Sennacherib) sent from Lachish with a threatening message to Jerusalem (2 Kings 18:17).
 Rabsares (in the Douay–Rheims Bible and the Vulgate) A prince of Nebuchadnezzar (Jeremiah 39:3,13). While originally translated to be the name of the persons it referred to, Rabsaris is now thought to be the name of an office or rank, not an individual.

See also 
Rabshakeh
Tartan (Assyrian)

References 

Books of Kings people
Set index articles on Hebrew Bible people